The Charlie Parker 10th Memorial Concert was recorded March 27, 1965, 10 years after the death of Charlie Parker, at Carnegie Hall in New York City. Its A&R director was Bobby Scott and it was released on Limelight Records the same year.  It has yet to be reissued on CD.

It also marks Dave Lambert's final recordings.

Track listing

Side 1
1.  "Um-Hmm! (Ode to Yard)" (7:00)
Dizzy Gillespie
James Moody
Kenny Barron
Chris White
Rudy Collins
2. "Groovin' High" (5:50)
Same personnel except Moody play alto sax
3.  "Now's the Time" (13:16)
Roy Eldridge
Coleman Hawkins
C. C. Siegel (J. J. Johnson pseudonym)
Billy Taylor
Tommy Potter
Roy Haynes

Side 2
4.  "Blues for Bird" (4:05)
Lee Konitz, unaccompanied alto sax solo
5. "Donna Lee" (2:42)
Dave Lambert
Billy Taylor
Tommy Potter
Roy Haynes
6. " Medley: Bird Watcher/Disorder at the Border" " (11:50)
Solo order on this track Billy Taylor, Tommy Potter, Kenny Dorham, Lee Konitz, C. C. Siegel, Dizzy Gillespie

References

Live jazz albums
1986 live albums
Dizzy Gillespie albums
Charlie Parker tribute albums
Roy Haynes albums
Kenny Dorham albums
Limelight Records albums
Verve Records live albums
Albums recorded at Carnegie Hall